Damjan Bohar (born 18 October 1991) is a Slovenian professional footballer who plays as a left winger for Zagłębie Lubin. Besides Slovenia, he has played in Poland and Croatia.

Career statistics

International 
Scores and results list Slovenia's goal tally first, score column indicates score after each Bohar goal.

Honours
Maribor
Slovenian PrvaLiga: 2013–14, 2014–15, 2016–17
Slovenian Cup: 2015–16
Slovenian Supercup: 2013, 2014

References

External links

 
 Player profile at NZS 

1991 births
Living people
People from Murska Sobota
Prekmurje Slovenes
Slovenian footballers
Slovenia youth international footballers
Slovenia under-21 international footballers
Slovenia international footballers
Association football wingers
ND Mura 05 players
NK Maribor players
Zagłębie Lubin players
NK Osijek players
Slovenian expatriate footballers
Slovenian expatriate sportspeople in Poland
Expatriate footballers in Poland
Slovenian expatriate sportspeople in Croatia
Expatriate footballers in Croatia
Slovenian Second League players
Slovenian PrvaLiga players
Ekstraklasa players
Croatian Football League players
II liga players